Rajesh Shukla is an Indian politician and member of the Bharatiya Janata Party. Shukla is a two-times member of the Uttarakhand Legislative Assembly from the Kichha constituency in Udham Singh Nagar district. In the latest elections of 2017, he defeated the sitting Chief Minister Of Uttarakhand Harish Rawat.

References 

People from Udham Singh Nagar district
Bharatiya Janata Party politicians from Uttarakhand
Members of the Uttarakhand Legislative Assembly
Living people
Uttarakhand MLAs 2017–2022
Year of birth missing (living people)